Baroness Julia von Mengden (Augusta Juliane) (1719–1786), was a Livonian noblewoman of German descent, lady in waiting, favourite, an intimate friend and a confidante of the Russian regent Grand Duchess Anna Leopoldovna.

Biography 
Baroness Augusta Juliane Julia was the daughter of the Livonian Baron Magnus Gustav von Mengden (1663-1726) and his third wife, Dorothea Sophie von Rosen (1690-1773). She participated in the coup that placed Grand Duchess Anna Leopoldovna in power 1740 and was named the official nurse of Ivan VI of Russia. She followed Anna Leopoldovna to her prison in Riga in 1741, but was then separated from her and imprisoned in Ranenburg. She was released by Catherine the Great in 1762.

References 
 

1719 births
1786 deaths

Ladies-in-waiting from the Russian Empire
Livonian nobility

Governesses to the Imperial Russian court
Julia von Mengden